Etiella scitivittalis is a species of snout moth in the genus Etiella. It was described by Francis Walker in 1863. It is found in Australia (Queensland and New South Wales).

References

External links
 

Moths described in 1863
Phycitini